Eleven Kids, One Summer is a children's novel written by Ann M. Martin in 1991. It is the sequel to Ten Kids, No Pets.

Plot
Eleven Kids, One Summer continues the story of the children of the Rosso family as they summer on a beach on Fire Island. The story also reveals that the youngest child, who had yet to be born in the previous book, is a boy named Keegan according to Mrs. Rosso's naming scheme.

Each chapter entails a story featuring a child of the family as they find some sort of adventure during their vacation. The children are: Abigail (Abbie), Bainbridge, Calandra (Candy), Dagwood (Woody), Eberhard (Hardy), Faustine and Gardenia (Dinnie) (the twins), Hannah, Ira, Janthina (Jan) and Keegan.

References

1991 American novels
1991 children's books
American children's novels
Sequel novels